Dillenia triquetra is a plant endemic to the island of Sri Lanka, where it is known as දියපර (diyapara) by local people.

Leaves
Broadly oblong oval, obtuse to blunt pointed apex, margins coarsely serrated; petiole channelled above in mature leaves; prominent fleshy horseshoe-shaped cushion on upper side of petiole of young leaves.

Trunk
Twigs smooth, brown, marked with large leaf scars.

Flowers
White, few, large, sepals fleshy and persistent; Inflorescence - small, racemes opposite leaves.

Fruits
Small, globular, enclosed by enlarged sepals.

Ecology
Secondary forest, scrub, disturbed areas.

Uses
Wood - furniture, light construction; fruit - medicinal.

References

External links
 http://www.mobot.org/MOBOT/Madagasc/dillen/00195708.html

Endemic flora of Sri Lanka
triquetra